Linda Morris was an American television producer and writer.  She is best known for her work on the television series Frasier, for which she received three Primetime Emmy Awards in 1994, 1995 and 1996 as a part of the producing and writing team.
  
Morris' other television credits include Welcome Back, Kotter, Alice, Life With Lucy, Doogie Howser, M.D. and Temporarily Yours, her last television credit. All of the aforementioned work was with her husband, fellow television producer and writer Vic Rauseo.

Both Morris and Rauseo are alums of Kean University.

References

External links 

American television producers
American women television producers
American television writers
Emmy Award winners
Kean University alumni
Living people
American women television writers
Place of birth missing (living people)
Year of birth missing (living people)
21st-century American women